Doudou Thiam (3 February 1926 – 6 July 1999) was a Senegalese diplomat, politician and lawyer. Thiam was the first ever foreign minister of independent Senegal (1960–1962) and the third (1962–1968). From 1970 until his death in 1999, Thiam was a member of the International Law Commission. 

During his almost three decades of service on the Commission, Thiam served as Special Rapporteur on one of the major projects of the Commission, the Draft Code of Crimes Against the Peace and Security of Mankind. The Commission resumed consideration of that topic, on the request of the General Assembly under Resolution 13/106 of 10 December 1981. He was appointed to that position in 1982 and served in that capacity between 1983 and 1995. His contribution included preparation of 13 reports for the Commission containing detailed analysis, texts and commentaries until completion of the Code containing 20 draft articles in 1996. He also held several offices on the Commission, including the post of Chairman of the Commission.

References

1926 births
1999 deaths
Senegalese diplomats
Foreign ministers of Senegal
Interior ministers of Senegal
International Law Commission officials
Government ministers of Senegal
20th-century Senegalese lawyers
Senegalese officials of the United Nations
Members of the International Law Commission